The Cline River is a short river in western Alberta, Canada. It flows from Pinto Lake and joins the North Saskatchewan River at Lake Abraham in west-central Alberta.

Geography
Pinto Lake is located north of Sunset Pass.  The lake is fed from the glacial meltwater of Minister Mountain, Mount Coleman, and Cirrus Mountain. The river then flows directly east, emptying into Lake Abraham.

The river, as well as Mount Cline and Cline Pass, are named for Michel Klyne, also referred to as Michael Cline. Klyne was employed as a fur trader by the Hudson's Bay Company and the North West Company.

Tributaries
Pinto Lake
Huntington Creek
Cataract Creek
McDonald Creek
Waterfalls Creek
Michele Lakes
Entry Creek
Lake of the Falls, Landslide Lake, Shoe Leather Creek
Sentinel Creek
Coral Creek
O.D. Creek

Previously known
Whitegoat River
Mirliton River

See also
List of Alberta rivers

References

Rivers of Alberta
North Saskatchewan River